Thiruvananthapuram State assembly constituency is one of the 140 state legislative assembly constituencies in Kerala. It is also one of the 7 state legislative assembly constituencies included in the Thiruvananthapuram Lok Sabha constituency. As of the 2021 assembly elections, the current MLA is Adv. Antony Raju of JKC.

Thiruvananthapuram constituency came into existence in 2011. Before it was known as Trivandrum West Constituency from 1977 to 2011, and Trivandrum-I constituency from 1957 to 1977.

Local self governed segments
Thiruvananthapuram Niyamasabha constituency is composed of the following local self governed segments:

Members of Legislative Assembly
The following list contains all members of Kerala legislative assembly who have represented Thiruvananthapuram Niyamasabha Constituency during the period of various assemblies:

Key

      

As Trivandrum-I

As Trivandrum West

As Thiruvananthapuram

Election results

Niyamasabha Election 2021

Percentage change (±%) denotes the change in the number of votes from the immediate previous election.

Niyamasabha Election 2016
There were 1,93,101 registered voters in Thiruvananthapuram Constituency for the 2016 Kerala Niyamasabha Election.

Niyamasabha Election 2011 
There were 1,77,442 registered voters in the constituency for the 2011 election.

See also 
 Thiruvananthapuram
 Thiruvananthapuram district
 List of constituencies of the Kerala Legislative Assembly
 2016 Kerala Legislative Assembly election

References

Assembly constituencies of Kerala

State assembly constituencies in Thiruvananthapuram district